Marxology is a systematic scholarly approach to the understanding of Karl Marx and Marxism. The term was first used by David Ryazanov, librarian of the Marx-Engels Institute in Moscow,  around 1920 as he set out to publish the complete works of Marx and Engels. During the Second World War, Maximilien Rubel introduced the term into France. He  was astonished by the lack of any sustained understanding of the life and works of Marx by self-proclaimed Marxists active in the French resistance during the occupation of Paris.

Marxology in the Soviet Union
A number of official publications in the Soviet Union praised Ryazanov as a Marxologist in 1930. He was:
 “the most eminent Marxologist of our time”, Izvestia , 10 March 1930
  “the most renowned and the most important of the Marxist scholars of our time” (Inprecor, no.26, 19 March 1930) 
 “under Riazonov’s direct scientific and administrative leadership, [the  Marx-Engels Institute] accomplished impressive work …with his considerable scientific and investigative activity in the sphere of marxology”, Pravda

However during investigations in preparation for the 1931 Menshevik Trial, Ryazanov was implicated under duress by his colleague Isaak Illich Rubin and expelled from the Communist Party.

Some Marxologists
In 1982 the following were listed in Review: Tendencies in Marxology and Tendencies in History (1982):
 Michel Henry: Marx: A Philosophy of Human Reality  ([1976], English translation with Michel Henry: Marx: A Philosophy of Human Reality, 1983)
 Roman Rosdolsky: The Making of Marx's Capital (1977)
 G. A. Cohen: Karl Marx's Theory of History (1978)
 John McMurtry: The Structure of Marx's World-View (1978)
 Melvin Rader: Marx's Interpretation of History (1979)
Robert Kurz: Geld ohne Wert : Grundrisse zu einer Transformation der Kritik der politischen ekonomie,  and: Marx lesen! : die wichtigsten Texte von Karl Marx für das 21. Jahrhundert 
Moishe Postone: Time labour and social domination (1993)

References

Marxism
Karl Marx